Mary Hodson (born 28 October 1946) is a British middle-distance runner. She competed in the women's 800 metres at the 1964 Summer Olympics.

References

1946 births
Living people
Athletes (track and field) at the 1964 Summer Olympics
British female middle-distance runners
Olympic athletes of Great Britain
Place of birth missing (living people)